Keith Lee may refer to:

 Keith Lee (American football) (born 1957), American football player
 Keith Lee (basketball) (born 1962), American basketball player
 Keith Lee (wrestler) (born 1984), American professional wrestler
 Keith-Lee Castle (born 1968), English actor